Tony Siscone (born March 25, 1950) was raised in the Collings Lakes section of Buena Vista Township, New Jersey. A resident of Hammonton, New Jersey, he graduated from Hammonton High School in 1967 and later went on to graduate from Rider University in 1971. Siscone was a successful high school teacher for 17 years. After receiving the "Governor's Teacher of the Year" award in 1987 Tony and his Wife started a successful racing safety equipment business, Safety Connection, for 14 years. In 1976, Siscone married Margaret "Margi" Clark, of Berlin, and they have two Children, Jaclyn (b. 1978) and A.Jay (b. 1981). Most Notably, Siscone was a very successful asphalt modified racecar driver from 1972 through 1994.

Racing career
Tony Siscone began his racing career driving go-karts between 1962-1969. Siscone had 90 victories which resulted in numerous IKF State and Regional go-kart titles. Siscone and his dad competed several times in IKF National Championship go-kart events against factory backed teams finishing in the top 6 twice. 

Siscone began his stock car racing career in 1972 driving the Richie Terruso Brothers' T3 sportsman car to 8 victories at Atlantic City Speedway and Wall Stadium. In 1974 at the Atlantic City Speedway Tony won his first track championship driving the T4 owned by his dad Tony Sr. and Tony Ruberti. 1975-76  Siscone drove the famous #65 car, owned by Johnny Lyons and powered by a Tom Skinner/Lyons chevy racing engine which Tony drove to 12 victories and his 2nd championship. In 1978, Tony also drove the 21X owned by Edward Brown III (6 wins), and the 21 owned by Sal DeBruno (4 wins) winning every race the 2 cars finished resulting in the track championship at the Atlantic City Speedway.

In 1973 Siscone felt that it was time to try to move up to the Modified stock car ranks. From 1973-1976 Siscone struggled to get his Modified career on track. The Terruso brothers gave Tony his first Modified opportunity but the team lacked the needed finances to compete with the top teams. Often Siscone was a spectator hanging around the pits willing to drive for anyone willing to give him a chance to prove himself. After 4 seasons Tony had no wins, 3-2nds and 15 top 5 finishes. Then in 1977 fellow Hammontonian Frank Ransom offered Siscone the ride in his state of the art, controversial #0 NASCAR Modified. The Ransom/Siscone Team won 3 modified events with a 355 c.i. small block against the big blocks at Wall Stadium and NASCAR's New Egypt Speedway. In April 1978, opening night at Wall Stadium, the Ransom/Siscone team make a statement by winning the modified main event. The following Wednesday Frank Ransom died at the age of 44. It was a difficult time for Tony Siscone since he and Frank Ransom had become very close friends and both had hopes of becoming a dominant team in NASCAR modified racing. For Siscone it was back to roaming the pits.

Then in August 1978 Dick & Robert Barney offer Tony a chance to drive their legendary #14 during the last 6 races of the season.  Siscone finishes  all 6 races in the top 5 with the 6-year-old #14. Siscone went on to drive the Dick Barney owned #14 for 16 1/2 consecutive years. During his 22 years behind the wheel, Tony collected 160 victories and 12 track championships (6 at Wall Stadium, 3 at Atlantic City Speedway, 2 at NASCAR's Flemington Speedway, and 1 at NASCAR's New Egypt Speedway). In 1983, the Barney/Siscone Team won the New Egypt Speedway NASCAR Championship finishing in the top 3 in every race with no DNF's. Siscone also won the 1984 NASCAR Cardinal 500 at the Martinsville Speedway, only 2 years after receiving serious burns to both hands at the Martinsville track after being involved in a fiery crash with Ray Evernham. Siscone won multiple victories at the Clearfield Speedway, Mahoning Valley Speedway, Evergreen Speedway, among others. During his Championship stints throughout the 1980s and early 1990s, Siscone at one point won 11 consecutive feature events at Flemington Speedway and tallied nearly 60 victories in Wall Stadium's NASCAR Modified division, ranking him second all-time in wins at the track behind Gil Hearne. Tony Siscone culminated his career with a victory in the 1994, 44th annual, Sunoco Race of Champions at Flemington Speedway, a race that Siscone had failed to win in 10 previous attempts. Siscone competed against many of the greatest modified drivers in the sports history, including: Richie Evans, Geoffrey Bodine, Gil Hearne, Reggie Ruggerio, Eddie Flemke Sr., Mike Stefanik, and many others.

Over the years Siscone became the proud recipient of the Fred DeSarro Sportsmanship award and the Toby Tobias Memorial award.

In 2000, Siscone was voted the 17th greatest asphalt modified driver in the Area Auto Racing News' "Top-25 Asphalt Modified Drivers of the 20th Century". Siscone was also inducted into the National Old Timers Hall of Fame in 1999 and the Garden State Vintage Stock Car Club's Hall of Fame in 2001. In January 2013 Siscone was inducted into the Eastern Motorsports Press Association Hall of Fame.

2014 aroused quite a bit of activity on Facebook, Twitter and several racing periodicals about Tony Siscone's 2 greatest victories. 30 years ago, Tony and the Dick Barney Team brought the Martinsville Grand Father clock to New Jersey after an emotional comeback win. 20 years ago, Siscone and Team 14 finally won the prestigious Race of Champions and Tony surprisingly retired in victory lane. The Siscone and Barney team, after 60 plus years, are still the only N.J. modified team to ever record victories at Martinsville Speedway and the Race of Champions.

References

1949 births
Living people
Rider University alumni
People from Hammonton, New Jersey
Racing drivers from New Jersey
Sportspeople from Atlantic County, New Jersey